Winston Morales Chavarro is a Colombian poet, novelist and journalist born in Neiva, in 1969. He has a master's degree in Latin American Literature from the Simon Bolivar Andean University in Quito. He is now a full-time professor teaching at the University of Cartagena. His poetry explores the history of mythology and the mystery of life. In his writing he seeks to analyse some of the most poets of the twentieth century in Latin America, including José Antonio Ramos Sucre, Carlos Obregon, César Dávila Andrade and Jaime Sáenz. His texts have been partially translated into French, Italian, English, Polish, German, Rumanian and Chinese included in different national and foreign anthologies.

He has given lectures and lectures at the Universities of Antioquia, Surcolombiana and Cartagena (Colombia); Szczecin, Krakow, Warsaw, Wroclaw, Zielona Gora and Poznan (Poland); Harvard, California, Salem, Merrimack and Northern Essex Community College (United States); Sonora (Mexico), and Granada (Spain).

Review 
Winston Morales is a universal opita, creator of a country where everyone, starting with the towel carriers and rifles on their shoulders, should go live, because there, as in the musical world of Macondo, it makes you want to sing "when the words they become aware of non-being in the presence of so many ghosts invisible ". There in Schuaima, the planet country of the Neivan poet, one can sip with the nose curled by the wind the smell of "the skirts invaded with geraniums" of the girls who inhabit it and who, like all its inhabitants, have "very heart close to the nose "and whose language makes it possible" to converse with the heights, with the acorns, with the wind in its state of purity, with the cosmos in its millenary harmony. "

Ignacio Ramírez

In her verses it happens, the living sage of authentic poetry is latent.

Adriana Herrera

Aniquirona

It is about from a collection of poems that points to another collection of poems -hightest spiral- where there are no words but silences as in the flowers, in tenderness, or in love.

Luis Rafael Gálvez

The raid on Back to Schuaima means conquering territories in the company of the most charming and enchanted character: Aniquirona, the beloved of all the dreamers on earth; the idealized one that puts us in communication with the beings that live beyond the daily flow. This thoughtfulness, the arrival of "Settlers" with their display of beauty captivating almost to delirium. The space that invades the one that follows with its unique aroma of forests and gardens, secret seas or aggressive rocks, or the subversive challenge of presences that are ignored despite their dazzling, sustain the spell, the great orchestration of all the elements.

Matilde Espinosa

These poems also appropriate an overwhelming poetic personality that, as in the other books of the author, creates a world and defends the features of that world, going through all the shades of black and gray, until achieving the very white texture, the turns sublime, religious, mystical, that distinguish the great poets. In Colombia, a country without a doubt difficult, there is poetry of great height, and this is the proof.

Enrique Serrano

By reading these Memoirs of Alexander de Brucco, we are witnessing the creation of a world that is indisputably supported by the aforementioned sacred history but is not defined there. It is now specified through the poem itself and the writing of the verse, defined and defended by the author himself through his images, his metaphors, through the poetic language and the tone that he reaches, through his own world and of his particular conception of history and myth. A book of poems that illuminates, that is full of light and colors and the nuances that are produced when the word passes through the prism that is the verse.

Santiago Tobon

Aniquirona: poetry, affluent towards mystery, deity of sounds and language, which can be transmuted into a woman, into magic or into the fire of things, but which will be, essentially, a song of nature. What river to wade, then, to reach the shore, to the transcendent? Travel with the poet through the forests "of winds and honeysuckle" and "very old chestnut trees", join in "the ceremony of flowers" and woo the light "in the breath of the air". Letting "the continuous voice of the rain" hit the road forever and abandon man in "the sap of the trees", in the ancestral shadow of poetry.

Daniuska Gonzalez

In his Memoirs, Brucco-Morales Chavarro manages to recreate -and that earned him the National Poetry Prize of the University of Antioquia-, in the poetic world, people of blood and bone who love, suffer, fight and have hope; manages to tear life and a new language from the myth.

Hubert Pöppel

Published work 
Poetry
 "Aniquirona", band of poetry, published by Trilce, Bogotá, Colombia, 1998
 "The Rain and the Angel", three poets from Huila, Neiva (In collaboration with Jáder Rivera Monje y Esmir Garcés Quiacha) poetry book, publisher Tricle, 1999
 "Back to Schuaima", published by Dauro, Granada, Spain, 2001
 "Memoirs of Alexander de Brucco", publisher University of Antioquia,  Medellín, Colombia, 2002
 "Poetic entirety", personal collection of poems, publisher Altazor, Bogotá, Colombia, 2005
 "Collection", poetry collection, National University, Bogotá, Colombia, 2009 
 "Road to Rogitama", band of poetry, publisher Trilce, Neiva, Colombia, 2010
 "The city of stones that sing", Book Hunting, Ibague, Colombia, 2011
 "Time was time", band of poetry, (Poems in French), publisher Altazor, Bogotá, Colombia, 2013
 "The sweet Aniquirona", Communicators University of Cartagena, Cartagena de Indias, Colombia, 2015
 "Where do the elapsed days go?", University of La Sabana, Bogotá, Colombia, 2016
"Encrypted lamp", International Academy Orient-Occident of Arges-Romania, Romania 2018
"The flight of the blue birds", Poetry, Edition, 2018

Novels
 "God put a smile on his face", 2004
Essays
 "Poetics of the Occult" in the writings of José Antonio Ramos Sucre, Carlos Obregón, César Dávila Andrade and Jaime Sáenz, publishers Trilce, Bogotá, Colombia, 2008
 "The beautiful awakens and other texts", publisher New People, Bogotá, Colombia, 2015
 "Tasks of Acoustics", Typeface dynamics at the University of Cartagena, publisher University of Cartagena, Cartagena de Indias, Colombia 1980 - 2009
 "Transits and persistence of the everyday: Hermeneutical approach to the lyrical and journalistic work of Jorge García Usta", publisher University of Cartagena, Cartagena de Indias, Colombia 2020
Translations
 "La douce Aniquirone et D`autres poemes somme poètique", (French translation by Marcel Kemadjou Njanke), 2013
 "Słodka Aniquirona", (Polish translation by Barbara Stawicka -Pirecka), Event at the University Adam Mickiewicz, Poland, 2017
 "Die süße Aniquirona", (German translation by Jeannette Vidoni), Communicators of the University of Cartagena, Cartagena de Indias, Colombia, 2018
"Lumină criptată", (Romanian translation by Valeria Dumitru), International Academy Orient-Occident of Arges-Romania, Romania 2018
"The sweet Aniquirona" (English translation by Luis Rafael Gálvez), 2019
"日子流逝何方？" (Mandarin translation by Lee Kuei-shien, 2020

Awards and honors 
First place in the House of Poetry, Organization Competition, Neiva, Colombia, 1996
 First place in the poetry competition José Eustasio Rivera, Colombia, 1997 and 1999
 First place in the competition department of the Ministry of Culture, Colombia, 1998
 First Place of the National Poetry Competition "Euclides Jaramillo Arango", University of Quindío, Colombia, 2000
 Second Place of the National Poetry Competition of the City of Chiquinquirá, Colombia, 2000
 First Place of the National Poetry Competition of the University of Antioquia, Medellín, Colombia, 2001
 Third place of the International Literary Competition of Outono, Brazil
 First place at the IX. National Biennial of Roman José Eustasio Rivera with the novel "God has a smile on his face", 2004
 Finalist of the Young Talent Award "The Fungible" Council of Alcobendas, Spain, 2005 
 First place of the National Poetry Competition of the Bolivar Technological University, Cartagena, Cartagena de Indias, Colombia 2005
 Winner with his project "Parallels of the Invisible" of the artistic residence of the Colombian Ministry of Culture and the Foncas of México, 2005
 Winner of the Poetry Competition of the Institute of Cultural Heritage of Cartagena, Cartagena de Indias, Colombia, 2013
 Winners of the History Competition Humberto Tafur Charry, 2013
 Invitation to the III. World Congress of Spanish-American Poets, Los Angeles, California, America, 2014
 First place at the Genaro Diáz Jordán competition, 2016 International Poetry Award "David Mejía Velilla", University of La Sabana, Bogotá, Colombia, 2014
 Honored as a writer on the XII. International Book Fair of Lawrence, Massachusetts, America, 2017 
 Award of Senators and State Chamber of Commerce representatives of Massachusetts, America, 2017 
 Award from the Office of the Mayor of Boston on the XII. International Book Fair of Lawrence, Massachusetts, America, 2017
 Award of the Order "Gustavo Hernández Riveros" in Neiva, Colombia, 2018 
 Excellence Award 2018 of the Journalist Community of Huila in Neiva, Colombia, 2018
First International Prize for Poetry at the International Poetry festival in Arges-Romania, 2018
Award of the Order "Cacique Timanco" in Huila, Colombia, 2018

External links 

https://www.diariohispaniola.com/noticia/34837/entretenimiento-y-cultura/xii-feria-libro-lawrence-homenajea-a-pina-contreras-y-morales-chavarro.html
https://www.lanacion.com.co/2018/07/10/asi-le-va-a-winston-morales-en-su-gira-por-europa/
https://letralia.com/noticias/2018/07/20/winston-morales-chavarro-gana-premio-de-poesia-en-rumania/
http://caracol.com.co/emisora/2018/09/11/cartagena/1536622257_884480.html
https://www.lanacion.com.co/2018/09/27/winston-morales-en-taiwan/
https://www.elespectador.com/noticias/cultura/el-poeta-winston-morales-chavarro-y-el-peligro-de-apropiarse-de-las-palabras-articulo-814934
https://letralia.com/lecturas/2018/11/05/el-vuelo-de-los-pajaros-azules-introduccion/
https://www.rdc.pl/patronaty/pisarz-i-poeta-winston-morales-chavarro-z-wizyta-w-polsce/
https://www.elcaracoli.com/articulo.php?id=56
https://www.notimerica.com/espana/noticia-autor-winston-morales-chavarro-lanza-dios-puso-sonrisa-rostro-circulo-rojo-20220410114027.html
https://www.elespectador.com/el-magazin-cultural/winston-morales-en-la-poesia-hay-muchos-poetas-de-formulas-article-641299/
https://www.lavanguardia.com/local/sevilla/20220410/8190629/autor-winston-morales-chavarro-lanza-dios-puso-sonrisa-sobre-rostro-circulo-rojo.html
https://theworldnews.net/mx-news/el-autor-winston-morales-chavarro-lanza-dios-puso-una-sonrisa-sobre-su-rostro-con-circulo-rojo

References 
 Morales Chavarro, Winston. Poetics of the occult, essays on four Latin American poets. 
 Morales Chavarro, Winston. Time was time, poems, publisher Altazor, Ibagué, 2013 
 Kemadjou Njanke, Marcel. La douce Aniquirone Et D`autres poemes somme poètique, French translations. Bogotá, 2014 
Jeannette Vidoni, Die süße Aniquirona, German translations. Deutschland, 2017 
Morales Chavarro, Winston. Lumina criptata, Romanian translations. Romania, 2018 
Luis Rafael Gálvez, The sweet Aniquirona, English translations. 2019 

Colombian essayists
1969 births
21st-century Colombian novelists
Colombian journalists
Male journalists
Living people
Colombian male poets
20th-century Colombian poets
20th-century male writers
21st-century Colombian poets
21st-century male writers
Colombian male novelists
Academic staff of the University of Cartagena